The Men's 50 metre butterfly competition at the 2022 World Aquatics Championships was held on 18 and 19 June 2022.

Records
Prior to the competition, the existing world and championship records were as follows.

Results

Heats
The heats were started on 18 June at 09:55.

Swim-off
The swim-off was held on 18 June at 11:39.

Semifinals
The heats were started on 18 June at 18:24.

Final
The final was held on 19 June at 18:48.

References

Men's 50 metre butterfly